Fear of Fear is a 1975 West German drama film by Rainer Werner Fassbinder starring Margit Carstensen. Fear of Fear is the fifth film by R. W. Fassbinder for the WDR in cooperation with editor Peter Märthesheimer.

Plot 
Margot, a woman in her mid-thirties, lives with her husband Kurt and their young daughter Bibi in their mother-in-law's house. Kurt's sister and her husband live above them. When Margot becomes pregnant, she begins to have anxiety attacks that are incomprehensible to herself and those around her. Her husband Kurt is caring, but only thinks about his exam and cannot help her. Her mother-in-law and sister-in-law, Lore, are ashamed of Margot's behavior. The pharmacist primarily has a relationship with her in mind and prescribes Valium for her without a prescription so she cannot get more later without going back to him.

Margot tries various distractions like swimming, shopping, and doing her hair, but continues to be plagued by anxiety. She becomes addicted to valium, drinks cognac like an addict and suddenly makes a suicide attempt. The doctors are at a loss: one diagnoses schizophrenia, in psychiatry a deep depression is diagnosed and work is prescribed as therapy.

Only two people, on the fringes of society, seek contact with the increasingly isolated Margot: her daughter Bibi and a mysterious neighbor. This latter is rejected by Margot and is found dead shortly afterwards, having hanged himself.

Cast 
 Margit Carstensen: Margot
 Ulrich Faulhaber: Kurt
 Brigitte Mira: Mother
 Irm Hermann: Lore
 Armin Meier: Karli
 Adrian Hoven: Dr. Merck
 Kurt Raab: Mr. Bauer
 Ingrid Caven: Edda
 Lilo Pempeit (R. W. Fassbinder's mother): Frau Schall
 Helga Märthesheimer: Dr. von Unruh
 Hark Bohm: Dr. Rozenbaum
 Herbert Steinmetz: Dr. Auer
 Constanze Haas: Bibi

Background 

The original script for the film was written by Asta Scheib in the form of the story "Langsame Tage" and sent to R. W. Fassbinder, whose films she admired. Asta Scheib was 35 years old at the time, a housewife and mother of two children. Until then, she had occasionally written articles for a local newspaper and a women's magazine. The story was her first film template. Fassbinder used it almost unchanged for his script.

Reviews

External links

References 

West German films
1970s German-language films
1975 films
1975 drama films
German drama films
Films directed by Rainer Werner Fassbinder
1970s German films